Grizelle González is a soil ecologist working for the United States Forest Service in San Juan, Puerto Rico. She is known for her work on soil ecology, nutrient cycling, and ecosystem ecology at the Sabana Field Research Station in Puerto Rico.

Early life and education 
González obtained her B.S. in biology (1993) and her M.S. in soil ecology (1996) from the University of Puerto Rico. She earned her Ph.D. from the University of Colorado-Boulder in soil ecology and biology in 1999. Her dissertation was focused on microbes, plant litter, and soil fauna in both tropical and subalpine forests. Grizelle started her professional career as a research associate at the University of Alaska Fairbanks in 1999. In 2000, she began her career at the United States Forest Service (USFS) International Institute of Tropical Forests (IITF), and in 2003 she became the director of the Sabana Field Research Station in Puerto Rico. She is also associated faculty at the University of Puerto Rico, Río Piedras Campus.

Research 
González's research has been focused on soil ecology, biogeochemistry, and nutrient cycling in tropical forests involving earthworms, and plant litter and decomposition in tropical environments. She has also examined earthworms as invasive species, and the role of elevation in controlling the distribution of earthworms. Her more recent work in Puerto Rico focuses on tropical forest ecology, where she focuses on research in El Yunque National Forest and an experimental forest on St. Thomas. González also served as science coordinator for the "Poetic Science" exhibits Museo de Arte Contemporáneo de Puerto Rico which won awards from the United States' Forest Service and the International Association of Art Critics. Following the 2017 Hurricane Maria, González has been examining the immediate impact of the hurricane on Puerto Rico, and its recovering in 2018 into 2019.

Selected publications

References

External links 

University of Puerto Rico alumni
University of Colorado Boulder alumni
Women ecologists
Year of birth missing (living people)
Living people